Aurel Stroe (5 May 1932, in Bucharest – 3 October 2008, in Mannheim) was a Romanian composer, philosopher and linguist. In 2002 he was awarded the Herder Prize from the University of Vienna; and in 2006 he was awarded the Promaetheus Prize by the Anonimul Foundation.

Life and career
From 1951 to 1956 Stroe studied piano with Maria Totino, composition with Mihail Andricu, and harmony with Marṭian Negrea at the Bucharest Conservatory. He also took summer courses at the Darmstadt Conservatory from 1966 to 1969 where he was a pupil of Mauricio Kagel, György Ligeti, and Karlheinz Stockhausen. He was awarded a scholarship from the German Academic Exchange Service which enabled him to pursue research at the International Comparative Musicology Institute of Alain Danielou in 1972-1973.

Stroe was appointed the position of reader at the Bucharest Conservatory in 1962. He left that position in 1985 to become a visiting professor at the University of Illinois. From 1986 to 1993 he was a professor of composition at the Mannheim Hochschule für Musik.

Musical works 

Including electronic music.

Opera 

 Asta nu va primi Nobel prize (1969) - opera în three parts (Paul Sterian) 
 Pacea  (1973) - opera în three acts (Aristophanes) 
 Trilogia Cetății Închise (1973-1988) opera, libretto after Aeschylus: Agamemnon / Orestia I (1973), Choeforele / Orestia II (1983), Eumenidele / Orestia III (1988) 
 Conciliul Mondial (1987) - chamber opera in two acts (Vladimir Solovyov} 
 Copilul și diavolul (1989) - opera in 5 scenes (Maria Tvetaeva)

Theatre music 

 Music for "Oedip la Colonos" (1963) - incidental music (Sophocles); 
 Rituelle Handlung ohne Gegenstand (1967) - dance music.

Vocal-symphonic music 

 Cantata festivă (1957) - for choir and orchestra (Pablo Neruda) 
 Chipul păcii (1959) - music for chamber orchestra and mezzo-soprano (Paul Eluard) 
 Țării mele (1959) - cantata for choir and orchestra (Victor Tulbure) 
 Monumentum I (1961) - poem for choir and orchestra (Nichita Stănescu) 
 Numai prin timp timpul poate fi cucerit (1965) - poems for baritone (T.S. Eliot) 
 Missa puerorum (1983) - for a cappella choir, organ and eight instruments

Symphonic music 

 Scherzo simfonic (1951)
 Sinfonia for the Orchestra Mare (1954)
 Burlesque Overture (1961)
 Arcade (1962)
 Laude I (1966)
 Canto I (1967)
 Laude II (1968)
 Canto II (1971)
 Simfonia (1973)
 Accords et Comptines (1988)
 Ciaccona con alcune licenze (1995)
 Preludii lirice (1999)
 Mandala cu o polifonie de Antonio Lotti (2000)

Concertante music 

 Concerto for string orchestra (1950, rev.1956)
 Concert music for piano, brass and percussion (1965)
 Concerto for clarinet and orchestra (1975)
 Concerto for violin and ensemble of soloists Capriccios and Ragas (1990)
 Concerto for saxophone and orchestra Prairie, Priere (1994)
 Concerto for accordion and orchestra (2001)
 Simfonia concertante for percussion and orchestra (1996)

Chamber music 

 Colinde (Christmas Carols) for piano (1947)
 Baladă (Ballad) for piano (1948)
 Trio for oboe, clarinet and bassoon (1953)
 Sonata No. 1 for piano Morphogenetic (1955)
 Fragment dintr-un proces sonor (Excerpt from a sound-process) (1969)
 În vis desfacem timpurile suprapuse (1970)
 String quartet in A major (1972)
 Grădina structurilor I (Garden Structures I) (1974)
 Ten pastoral pieces for organ and clavecin (1979)
 Pe drumul către focurile cerești (Journey to Celestial Fires) for solo viola (1979)
 Fiicele Soarelui (Daughters of the Sun) (1979)
 Sonata No. 2 for piano Thermodynamic (1983)
 Anamorfoze canonice (1984)
 Sonata No. 3 for piano En Palimpseste (1992)
 Mozart sound introspection, string trio (1994)
 Gesang der Geister über den Wassern for voice, clarinet and piano or clavecin (celesta) (1999)
 Humoreske mit zwei Durchblicken zum Seeren (2002)

Choral music 

 Vine trenul (Coming by Train) (1961)
 Cântec simplu (Simple Song) (1962)

Vocal music 

 5 Songs for Soprano and piano: Colind, Moștenire, Făcătură, Doi copii s-au dus, În perdea (1949)
 5 Songs on verses by Clément Marot (1949)
 Two Songs on verses by Ion Pillat (1953)
 Two Romances for mezzo-soprano and piano: Și dacă..., La steaua (1954)

Electronic music 

 Midi le Juste (1970)

References

Bibliography 

 Cosma, V. (2005). Muzicieni din România. Lexicon. Vol. 8 (P-S). București: Editura muzicală. 
 Omul zilei (Man of the Day) - Aurel Stroe, 20 October 2006, Violeta Cristea, Ramona Vintilă, Jurnalul Național

External links
 Aurel Stroe website
  Aurel Stroe, biography website 433.ro - contemporary and classical Romanian musicians and composers

1932 births
2008 deaths
National University of Music Bucharest alumni
Academic staff of the National University of Music Bucharest
Romanian composers
University of Illinois faculty
Herder Prize recipients